Masked Republic is a website and media company that specializes in Lucha libre (mexican style professional wrestling) merchandise, ranging from wrestling masks, toys, clothes and comic books. It is the largest seller of lucha libre related products and has also created their own wrestling Pay-per-views. The company also has a charity division. It is run by founder and CEO Ruben Zamora, and President and COO Kevin Kleinrock.

See also
 List of professional wrestling websites

References

External links

Professional wrestling websites
Lucha libre